M.L.A.  is a 1957 Indian Telugu-language sociopolitical film directed and produced by K. B. Tilak.

The film was dubbed into Tamil with the same title and released in 1957.

Cast
Jaggayya as Dasu
Savitri as Nirmala
Gummadi as Damodaram
J. V. Ramana Murthi as Ramesh	
Girija as Kamala		
Ramana Reddy		
Suryakala as Leela	
Perumallu as Bhushaiah 
Nagabhushanam as Papaiah
Khurshid in the song "Sarasulu Chathurulu Saahasavanthulu"

Soundtrack 
Lyrics by Arudra and Koganti Gopalakrishnaiah.
"Sarasulu Chathurulu Saahasavanthulu" - P. Susheela
"Kotalo Nee Seetekkadunnadi"
"Guttuga Maa Maata Vinavayyaa"
"Mathrudesamunaku Pareekshadinamidi"
"Nee Aasa Adiyaasa" - Sishtla Janaki, Ghantasala
"Idenandi Idenandi Bhagyanagaramu" - Sishtla Janaki, Ghantasala
"Jami Chettu Meeda Nunna Jaathi Ramachiluka" - A. M. Rajah
"Namo Namo Bapu Maaku Nyaya Margame Choopu" - Madhavapeddi Satyam, P. Susheela

References

External links

 - A song sung by P. B. Srinivas and Jikki from the dubbed Tamil version.

1950s Telugu-language films
1957 films
Films scored by Pendyala Nageswara Rao
Films directed by K. B. Tilak